James Lowry may refer to:
James Lowry Donaldson (1814–1885), American soldier and author
James Lowry Jr. (1820–1876), American politician
James Lowry Robinson (1838–1887), American Democratic politician
James K. Lowry (born 1942) zoologist